Depressaria incognitella is a moth of the family Depressariidae. It is found in France, Spain, Switzerland and Italy.

References

External links
lepiforum.de

Moths described in 1990
Depressaria
Moths of Europe